The Berlanga Awards, originally known as Valencian Audiovisual Awards, are the main film awards of the Valencian Community, Spain, presented by the  (AVAV) and the  (IVC), and celebrated annually.

History 
The trophies consist of an abstract sculpture blending stone and methacrylate designed by local artist . The ceremony was broadcast on the regional broadcaster À Punt. New categories were introduced in the 2nd edition, broadening the scope of the awards to television series, web series and videogames, up to a total of 23 categories overall.
In 2021, on the occasion of the one hundred anniversary of the birth of Luis García Berlanga, the regional ministry of Education, Culture and Sport agreed on the renaming of the awards to Berlanga Awards from the 4th edition onward to pay homage to the Valencia-born filmmaker.

List of ceremonies

See also 
 Gaudí Awards
 Mestre Mateo Awards

References 

Awards established in 2018
2018 establishments in Spain
Recurring events established in 2018
Annual events in Spain
Spanish film awards
Spanish television awards
Valencian culture